Paloma Rao (born 4 February 1986), is an Indian music VJ, RJ and actress.

Career
A graduate of B.Sc Visual Communication from Loyola College, Chennai, Paloma began her career as a theatre artist. In 2004 she became a VJ on SS Music, and hosted the popular shows First Frame, Autograph and Just Connect. She played a cameo role in Unnale Unnale, which became a hit at the box-office. She now hosts the Live Cafe On Radio Station Chennai Live 104.8 FM. She now hosts shows for Star Sports. In 2016 Paloma anchored the Tamil Nadu Premier League and in 2017 the ICC Champions Trophy.

Filmography

References 

Tamil actresses
Indian film actresses
Living people
1986 births
Loyola College, Chennai alumni
Actresses from Chennai
Actresses of European descent in Indian films
Telugu people
Indian people of German descent
Anglo-Indian people